Sunway Lagoon is an amusement park located in Bandar Sunway, Subang Jaya, Selangor, Malaysia owned by Sunway Group.

History
The park began operations in 1992 and was officiated by the then Prime Minister of Malaysia, Tun Mahathir bin Mohamad, on 29 April 1993.

Since its opening, the theme park has added Malaysia’s first surf simulator, the FlowRider in 2010; Malaysia’s first 5D Waterplexx in 2012 and a very large water ride, Vuvuzela, in 2013.

Timeline

Geology

Attractions

Concerts and events 
Sunway Lagoon has hosted some of the international lifestyle, music and sporting events including MTV World Stage (2009 to 2015) and Quiksilver Revolution Tour (2006 and 2008). Other concerts hosted are deadmau5 (2011), The Native Tour by OneRepublic, Pitbull (2011), and many more.

Awards 
 2015: Silver Award in the Entertainment Category at the Putra Brand Awards 2015.
 2014: 2014 Putra Brand Award (Silver) in Entertainment category.
 2012: Best Attraction/ Tourism Experience Excellence Award by Expatriate Lifestyle.
 2011: Named top 3 International Water Park for Year 2011 by Hanley Wood Aquatics International (HWAI), a leading American based business-to-business media company.
 2011: Brand Specialty Awards BrandLaureate – SMEs Chapter Awards 2011 for Most Creative Brand organised by Asia Pacific Brands Foundation (APBF).
 2011: Malaysia Achievement Awards 2011 – Hall of Fame Awards under ASEAN’s Most Recognisable Brand; Theme Park & Attraction 2010, Asia’s Best Attraction 2010 and Asia’s Best Waterpark 2010 category.
 2010: Asia’s Best Water Park Award 2011 by International Amusement Parks and Attractions Association (IAAPA).
 2010: Asian Attraction Expo 2010 in Asia’s Best Attraction award by International Association of Amusement Parks and Attraction (IAAPA).
 2009: BrandLaureate SMEs Chapter Award in Best Brand in Corporate Building – Leisure – Theme Park.
 2009: Asia’s Best Attraction 2009 (Medium Attraction Category) at International Association of Amusement Parks & Attractions (IAAPA).
 2008: Asia’s Best Attractions 2008 Awards (Medium Category) at International Association of Amusement Parks and Attractions (IAAPA).
 2007: Best Asian Attractions Awards 2007.
 1993: FIABCI – Malaysia Property Award 2000 for Best Leisure Development.

Access

Public transportation

 BRT Sunway Lagoon on the BRT Sunway Line.

Sunway Lagoon is also accessible from the Subang Airport via the Skypark Link with an interchange at  Subang Jaya station.

See also
 Sunway Group
 Mining in Malaysia

References

External links

 Facebook - Sunway Lagoon, Malaysia
 Tourism Malaysia - Sunway Lagoon Theme Park

Amusement parks in Malaysia
Animal theme parks
Water parks in Malaysia
1993 establishments in Malaysia
Buildings and structures in Selangor
Tourist attractions in Selangor
Amusement parks opened in 1993
Subang Jaya
Sunway Group